Thray Sithu Nyan Tun (born 12 January 1954) is a Burmese politician who currently serves as a member of parliament in the House of Representatives for Zigon Township constituency. He previously served as Second Vice President of Myanmar from 15 August 2012 to 30 March 2016. He is a commander-in-chief of the Myanmar Navy with the rank of admiral, retired in 2012. He was elected as Second Vice President of Myanmar on 15 August 2012 following the resignation of Tin Aung Myint Oo.

Early life
Nyan was born on 12 January 1954 in Zigon Township, Bago Region, Myanmar to parent Sein Maung and his wife Thein Tin.

Military career
Nyan graduated from the 16th intake of the Defence Services Academy in 1975 and served as commander-in-chief of the Navy from June 2008. He was promoted to vice admiral in 2010 and made an admiral in 2012. He was awarded the title of Thray Sithu on 4 January 2012.

As commander-in-chief of the navy, Nyan Tun oversaw a naval standoff with Bangladesh, the mending of Burmese-Bangladesh bilateral relations, the expansion of military relations with India and the modernization of the Burmese Navy, including the acquirement of two frigates from China.

Political career
Nyan Tun was elected as 2nd Second Vice President on 15 August 2012 following the resignation of Tin Aung Myint Oo, and term end in 30 March 2016.

In the 2015 Myanmar general election, he contested the Zigon Township constituency, and won a Pyithu Hluttaw seat.

References

1954 births
Burmese generals
Burmese military personnel
Defence Services Academy alumni
Living people
People from Bago Region
Vice-presidents of Myanmar
Union Solidarity and Development Party politicians
Recipients of the Order of the Union of Myanmar